"Holder Fast" (English: "Holding On") is a single by Danish Los Angeles-based music producer Hennedub, featuring vocals from Danish rapper Gilli and Danish band Lukas Graham. The song was released as a digital download on 27 April, 2018 through Then We Take the World and Universal Music Denmark. The song peaked at number one on the Danish Singles Chart.

Track listing

Charts

Weekly charts

Release history

References

2018 songs
2018 singles
Lukas Graham songs
Number-one singles in Denmark
Songs written by Lukas Forchhammer
Universal Music Group singles